Alberto Gómez  (born 10 June 1944) is a retired Uruguayan football player. He has played for Uruguay football team in the 1970 World Cup, where he came on as a substitute against the then USSR.

References

External links

1944 births
Uruguayan footballers
Uruguay international footballers
1970 FIFA World Cup players
Liverpool F.C. (Montevideo) players
Living people

Association football midfielders